Watcha Clan is a band from Marseille, France, that mixes influences of reggae, dub, electronica, and jungle.

Their lyrics include elements of Arabic, Hebrew, Spanish, Yiddish, Tamashek, French, and English.

Their album Diaspora Hi-Fi was in the Top 20 on World Music Charts Europe for three months.

Notable performances
globalFEST 2009 at Webster Hall's Studio in New York City
12th Annual Chicago Folk & Roots Festival 2009
Grand Performances 2011 in Los Angeles California
Lowlands(festival) 2013 in the Netherlands

Members
Sista K : Lead vocals, dancing
Matt labesse : bass, double bass, guitar
Suprem Clem : keyboards, accordion, sampling, drum machines
Nassim Kouti : guitar, vocals, percussion

Discography
Live at Cabaret Rouge (2001, Vaï La Bott/Sous-Marin)
Nomades A.K.A. (2002, Vaï La Bott)
Le Bastion (2005, Vaï La Bott)
Live Injection (2006, Vaï La Bott)
Diaspora Hi-Fi (2008, Vaï La Bott/Piranha Musik)
Diaspora Remixed (2009, Vaï La Bott/Piranha Musik)
Radio Babel (2011, Vaï La Bott/Piranha Musik)

References

External links

globalFEST 2009 Concert audio recording on NPR website
Global Beat Fusion: Watcha Clan Live at Summerstage (HuffingtonPost)

1999 establishments in France
Musical groups established in 1999
Musical groups from Marseille